Sky Riders (also known as Assault on the Forbidden Fortress) is a 1976 American action film directed by Douglas Hickox and starring James Coburn, Susannah York and Robert Culp.

The rescue sequences were filmed in Meteora in Greece where the finale of the later James Bond film For Your Eyes Only was also set later in 1981.

On January 17, 2012 the film was released on DVD through Shout! Factory as part of a double feature with The Last Hard Men.

Plot summary
In Greece, the wife and children of American businessman Jonas Bracken are kidnapped by a radical group, the World Activist Revolutionary Army, who demand a ransom of $5 million for their safe return. Bracken raises the ransom money from selling off parts of his business empire, but the kidnappers then make further demands, requiring Bracken to use the money to purchase arms and ammunition for them. Inspector Nikolidis of the Greek police is put in charge of case. Jim McCabe, a smuggler who is Ellen Bracken's ex-husband and father to their son, reads about the kidnapping in the newspapers and meets with Bracken.

Police trace a radio signal used by the kidnappers and close in on the location, only to discover it is a decoy. A booby-trap detonates, killing several officers including Nikolidis's nephew. Nikolidis and McCabe agree that the kidnappers must be stopped, perhaps by any means. The kidnappers send a photograph of Ellen and the children as proof that they are still alive and, without the police knowing, McCabe uses a contact to trace their location based on a painted fresco in the background of the photo. He discovers that they are being held in a remote cliff-top monastery.

McCabe finds a hang glider flying circus and hires them to take part in a rescue mission. When Nikolidis discovers that McCabe has gone to free Bracken's family, the police decide to launch their own rescue plan and move in. McCabe's team use their hang gliders to infiltrate the monastery and free the hostages, but are discovered as they are leaving. While a gun battle ensues between the kidnappers and the police at the monastery, McCabe's team and the hostages are pursued and eventually escape on their hang gliders. The head kidnapper chases them in a helicopter, which McCabe forces to crash land. The head kidnapper then commits suicide rather than be captured and Bracken is reunited with his family.

Cast
 James Coburn - Jim McCabe 
 Susannah York - Ellen Bracken 
 Robert Culp - Jonas Bracken 
 Charles Aznavour - Insp. Nikolidis 
 Harry Andrews - Auerbach 
 John Beck - Ben 
 Zouzou - Female terrorist 
 Kenneth Griffith - Wasserman 
 Werner Pochath - Terrorist #1 
 Anthony Antypas - Dimitri 
 Telis Zotos - Bracken's secretary 
 Nikos Tsachiridis - Gatekeeper 
 Ernie F. Orsatti - Joe 
 Barbara Trentham - Della 
 Henry Brown - Martin

Production
Coburn's casting was announced in May 1975. The film was part of a slate of productions from Sandy Howard.

After an explosion on the set of Sky Riders in which a Greek electrician died, producer Terry Morse Jr. was arrested and producer Sandy Howard was detained for several weeks. A $250,000 out-of-court settlement was made, which one Variety article called a "bribe" so the crew member responsible would not be imprisoned by the military regime.

Reception
The film was a failure at the box office in the US but did better internationally.

Howard hired Jack Hill to write a sequel. He later said "I pitched them my idea, which they thought was good, and I wrote the script. Well, it turned out that the movie was a big flop and no one could understand why. I knew why - it was because they had the theory that it should be wall to wall action and there is nothing more boring." Hill then wrote City on Fire and Death Ship for Howard.

References

External links
 
 
 
 

1976 films
American action films
Films directed by Douglas Hickox
Films set in Greece
Films shot in Thessaly
Films set in Thessaly
1970s action films
American aviation films
Films about kidnapping
Films about terrorism
Films scored by Lalo Schifrin
Films with screenplays by Stanley Mann
1970s English-language films
1970s American films